Raiko Arozarena González (born 27 March 1997) is a Cuban footballer who currently plays as a goalkeeper for the Tampa Bay Rowdies in the USL Championship.

Career
After trying baseball he decided to follow in his father's footsteps and become a goalkeeper, beginning his career with local club Pinar del Río.

On 9 April 2021, Arozarena joined USL Championship side Tampa Bay Rowdies. Arozarena made his debut for the Rowdies on 20 October 2021, in a 3–0 home win over Miami FC.

On 12 July 2022, Arozarena was loaned to Forward Madison FC in USL League One. Madison sent goalkeeper Phil Breno to Tampa Bay as part of the deal. Arozarena returned to Tampa Bay on 20 October 2022, following the end of the 2022 USL League One season.

Personal
Arozarena's older brother is professional baseball outfielder Randy Arozarena, who plays for the Tampa Bay Rays.

Career statistics

Club

Notes

References

External links
 

1997 births
Living people
Cuban footballers
Cuba under-20 international footballers
Cuban expatriate footballers
Association football goalkeepers
Liga Premier de México players
FC Pinar del Río players
Venados F.C. players
Cafetaleros de Chiapas footballers
Expatriate footballers in Mexico
Cuban expatriate sportspeople in Mexico
People from Pinar del Río
Expatriate soccer players in the United States
Cuban expatriate sportspeople in the United States
Tampa Bay Rowdies players
USL Championship players
Forward Madison FC players
USL League One players